ZS Associates is a management consulting and professional services firm focusing on consulting, software, and technology, headquartered in Evanston, Illinois that provides services for clients in healthcare, private equity, and technology. The firm was founded in 1983 by two professors at Northwestern University who developed sales force alignment models using the world’s first personal-computer-aided territory mapping system. ZS continues to offer sales force alignment service to this day, in addition to a range of professional services, many of which are supported by advanced analytics.
	
The firm employs more than 12,000 employees  in 35 offices in North America, South America, Europe and Asia. 

The company was chosen by Forbes magazine as one of America’s best management and consulting firms in 2019  and has been awarded for its company culture by Consulting magazine for several years in a row. The company has also been recognized by the Human Rights Campaign Foundation for earning 100 percent on their Annual Corporate Equality Index for LGBTQ workplace equality.

History 

ZS Associates was founded by Andris(Andy) Zoltners, Frederic Esser Nemmers Distinguished Professor Emeritus of Marketing at the Kellogg School of Management and Prabhakant (Prabha) Sinha, a former associate professor of marketing at the Kellogg School of Management. At Kellogg, Sinha and Zoltners developed a side business advising companies on sales and marketing, which evolved into ZS Associates.

In 1982, Zoltners and Sinha presented their sales force sizing and territory alignment models to their academic colleagues, demonstrating the world’s first personal-computer-aided territory mapping system. In 1983, Sinha joined Zoltners at Northwestern, and the pair founded ZS Associates in their off hours, offering companies increased sales force efficiency using their now-proven territory mapping software. In its first three years, ZS had helped eight of the 10 largest pharmaceutical companies in the world, including Pfizer, align territories and resize their sales forces. By that time, the 25-member team worked on 100 or more projects in a dozen countries—including the United States, Canada and many European countries.

In 1987, a large American company hired ZS to reorganize, redesign and reallocate their US-based sales force. In addition to deploying their sales territory alignment services, ZS also supported the company in change management, and built tools like incentive compensation programs to support the human resources of the company’s marketing and sales division.

Through the 1990s, ZS continued to develop its capabilities, adding data warehousing, market forecasting, market research and analytical services for their clients. The firm also broke into sales force incentive compensation program auditing, design and implementation during these years.

In 2002, ZS added a marketing research practice to the company that would soon expand and evolve into marketing services. 2004 saw Zoltners and Sinha win the Marketing Science Practice Prize from the Institute for Operations Research and the Management Sciences (INFORMS) for their paper, Sales Territory Design: 30 Years of Modeling and Implementation, which explored the “[m]odels, systems, processes, and wisdom [that] have evolved over 1,500 project implementations for 500 companies with 500,000 sales territories.”

Organization

Research and Publishing 
ZS regularly publishes original blogs, articles, infographics, whitepapers and video content to its website and in external publications including national media such as Forbes and trade magazines such as Pharmaceutical Executive, In Vivo and Medcity News. Topics range from airline revenue management and customer experience to drug pricing and pharma commercial models. 

ZS employees have also written and published dozens of books on subjects including sales compensation and sales leadership.

Founders Zoltners and Sinha have written for Harvard Business Review on many occasions over the past decade, contributing more than 40 articles on a range of sales and marketing topics, with particular emphasis on healthcare marketing and healthcare analytics.

ZS employees have been quoted as experts in the field in The Wall Street Journal, The New York Times, Business Insider, NPR and many others.

Industries 
ZS operates as a strategic, long-term advisor to its clients, basing its offerings on clients’ needs and challenges across the following industries: 

 Pharmaceuticals and Biotech
 Medical Technology
 Health Plans 
 Travel and Hospitality
Industrials and Business Services
 High-Tech and Telecommunications
 Financial Services
 Private Equity

References 

Companies based in Evanston, Illinois